Quillagua is an oasis in the Tocopilla Province, in the Antofagasta Region of northern Chile. It is a part of the commune of María Elena. The Loa River is crossed by the Pan-American Highway in this area.
According to the Dirección Meteorológica de Chile, Quillagua is drier than Arica and thus it is the driest place on Earth. This is also recognized by the Guinness Book of Records.

See also
2007 Tocopilla earthquake
Atacama

References

Oases of Chile
Landforms of Antofagasta Region
Weather extremes of Earth